NGC 5050 is a lenticular galaxy in the constellation Virgo. It was discovered by a German astronomer Albert Marth on April 30, 1864. It is also known as CGCG 44-43, MCG 1-34-12, PGC 46138, UGC 8329.

Marth discovered it in Malta with the help of Lassel's 48" reflector. It is faint, small and stellar with an apparent magnitude of 1.4.

See also 
 New General Catalogue

References

External links 
 

5050
Lenticular galaxies
Virgo (constellation)